Crypsithyrodes is a genus of moths belonging to the family Tineidae.

Species
Crypsithyrodes auriculata (Meyrick, 1917)
Crypsithyrodes concolorella (Walker, 1863)
Crypsithyrodes spectatrix (Meyrick, 1911)

References

Tineidae
Tineidae genera